Méasnes is a commune in the Creuse department in the Nouvelle-Aquitaine region in central France.

Geography
A small tributary of the Petite Creuse, the river Lavaud flows through the middle of the village.

Population

Sights
 The church of St. Gervaix, dating from the fourteenth century.
 Traces of the medieval Cistercian abbey of Aubepierre, destroyed in the sixteenth century.
 Ruins of the castle of Lavaud.
 The château at Plaix-Goliard.

See also
Communes of the Creuse department

References

Communes of Creuse